Arthromelodes choui is a species of beetle belonging to the rove beetle family. Specimens have been collected from northern Taitung, Taiwan.

Etymology
The specific name choui is in honor of the Taiwanese specialist of the Cerambycidae, Wen-I Chou.

Description
Males range from 2.09–2.22 mm in length. Male bodies are reddish-brown. The head and pronotum are sparsely punctate, and the abdomen slightly narrower than the elytra.

References

Pselaphinae
Insects of Taiwan
Beetles described in 2018